Peter Khoy Saukam (born Saukam Khoy ; 2 February 1915 – 14 November 2008) was a Cambodian politician who served as Acting President of the Khmer Republic for 12 days in April 1975. He was President of the Senate from 1972 to 1975.

Early life
Born on 2 February 1915, Saukam Khoy enlisted into the Khmer Royal Army in 1940, when he was 25. He achieved the rank of lieutenant-colonel in 1953 and subsequently, lieutenant-general. He became President of the Senate of the Khmer Republic in 1972.

Presidency
He took office on 1 April 1975, when a tearful Lon Nol left 'temporarily' with his entire family for Bali in Indonesia after an invitation from his friend, Indonesian President Suharto.

Khoy's time in office was short. He left Phnom Penh together with American Ambassador John Gunther Dean aboard a CH-53 helicopter during the evacuation of American embassy staff and civilians, dubbed Operation Eagle Pull on 12 April, just five days before Phnom Penh fell to the Khmer Rouge.

Khoy died at the age of 93 in Stockton, California, United States, on 14 November 2008.

References

1915 births
2008 deaths
20th-century Cambodian politicians 
Cambodian emigrants to the United States
Cambodian republicans
Politicians from Stockton, California
Social Republican Party politicians 
Heads of state of Cambodia
Presidents of the Senate (Cambodia)
Khmer Republic